Lillpite River (Swedish: Lillpiteälven) is a river in Sweden.

References

Norrbotten
Rivers of Norrbotten County